Provided is a list of all Strawberry Shortcake games (excluding video titles playable only on gaming devices) released to date.

The first game produced was Strawberry Shortcake: Musical Match-Ups which featured simplistic gameplay and graphics and sound that were crude by today's standards. This was followed by a movie (Strawberry Shortcake's Housewarming Surprise) and a wide two decade gap before another game from the franchise was finally produced, for the PC.

References

Lists of video games by franchise
Video games based on Hasbro toys
Strawberry Shortcake
Strawberry Shortcake